Railey Jeffrey (31 May 1945 – 26 December 2020) was a Malaysian politician who served as the Deputy Minister of Information from May 1987 to May 1995, Deputy Minister of Works from May 1995 to December 1999 and Member of Parliament (MP) for Silam from April 1986 to March 2004. He was a member of the United Sabah National Organisation (USNO) and United Malays National Organisation (UMNO) party, a component party of the ruling Barisan Nasional (BN) coalition.

Election results

Honours

Honours of Malaysia
  :
  Companion of the Order of the Defender of the Realm (JMN) (1991)
  :
  Commander of the Order of Kinabalu (PGDK) – Datuk (1994)

References

1945 births
2020 deaths
Sabah politicians
United Malays National Organisation politicians
Members of the Dewan Rakyat
Commanders of the Order of Kinabalu